Jacob Westberg (15 December 1885 – 9 August 1933) was a Swedish long-distance runner. He competed in the marathon at the 1912 Summer Olympics.

References

External links

1885 births
1933 deaths
Athletes (track and field) at the 1912 Summer Olympics
Swedish male long-distance runners
Swedish male marathon runners
Olympic athletes of Sweden
Athletes from Stockholm